The Hare Virus was a destructive computer virus which infected DOS and Windows 95 machines in August 1996.  It was also known as Hare.7610, Krsna and HD Euthanasia.

Description
The virus was capable of infecting .COM and .EXE executable files, as well as the master boot record of hard disks and the boot sector on floppy disks.  The virus was set to read the system date of the computer and activate on August 22 and September 22, at which time it would erase the hard disk in the computer and display the following message:

HDEuthanasia by Demon Emperor: Hare Krsna, hare, hare

Timing
The date of the virus is controversial, even there is consensus that it started spreading at the end of the spring or at the beginning of the summer of 1996 in New Zealand, experts seem to disagree about the precise timing of the start of the spread. After a little while, its effects started to show up in South Africa and Canada. The United States saw the arrival of Hare in May 1996 and then continued spreading globally to Western and Eastern Europe.

See also
Timeline of computer viruses and worms
Comparison of computer viruses

References

External links
Hare Virus by Online VSUM.
Hare Krishna virus looming (The Augusta Chronicle)

DOS file viruses
Boot viruses